Pegasus is a clone of the Nintendo Famicom (Japanese original model of the Nintendo Entertainment System) that was sold in the Czech Republic, Poland, Bosnia-Herzegovina and the Federal Republic of Yugoslavia during the early to mid 1990s.

Hardware

History
The system was manufactured in Taiwan and built to resemble Nintendo Famicom. Pegasus, like most known NES clones, was compatible with 60-pin Famicom cartridges, and partially compatible with some NES games, which could be played using a special converter. 

The typical retail set included the system and two detachable gamepads (both with "turbo" buttons, which meant 4 buttons in total; 6-button controllers also existed.) power supply, RF cable, as well as audio-video RCA connectors. Additionaly customers could by light gun called Casel (very similar in design to NES Zapper) and special joystick.The system itself didn't include any built-in games, but was bundled with an infringing cartridge labelled "Contra 168-in-1", which contained a 34 games, such as Contra, Super Mario Bros., Tetris, Donkey Kong, Bomberman, Arkanoid, Popeye, Pac-Man etc. Most of the games had a "trainer" feature, which allowed the player to adjust the number of lives, and even the starting level of the game.

This particular Famiclone was popular in Poland, Serbia, and Bosnia, where it gained cult status, and was widely available at flea markets. In some countries, clones from this brand have been created which can play NES cartridges. An example is Indonesia where Spica Club sold such models.

In Poland, Pegasus was marketed by established in 1991, BobMark International. The first model called MT-777DX, became very popular between 1992 and 1993. Bobmark pushed on the market new consoles like Super Pegasus, which was Famicom designed to look like Super Nintendo and Pegasus Game Boy, which was a cheaper clone of Game Boy. In 1994, changes in Polish copyright law resulted that BobMark get rid of bootleg games and bought official license to software published by Codemasters, Sachen and Western Technologies and distribute them in Asian cartridges. The most popular were to bundles called Pegasus Golden Four and Pegasus Golden Five that contained Codemasters games. BobMark also released new model called IQ-502 with uniqe design. In late 1994, Nintendo finally started to sell Super Nintendo, Nintendo Entertainment System, Game Boy etc. in Poland. BobMark at the same time began to sell official Sega products like Sega Mega Drive, Sega Game Gear, Sega Master System etc., trying to slowly change it's activity to more legal. From that time Pegasus brand began to slowly lose it's importants due to more cheaper clones and new generation consoles. BobMark tried to popularize 16-bit Sega standards with Power Pegasus, a clone of Mega Drive, bundled with official Sega games, but sales weren't as good as 8-bit Pegasus. BobMark continue to sell Sega and Pegasus until late 1990s, when founders due to heavy losses, began to invest in Hoop drinks.

See also 
 Dendy
 Ending-Man Terminator

References

External links
EMU-NES, a Polish website about Pegasus and similar systems
Cartridges/carts gallery
History of famiclones in Poland

Unlicensed Nintendo Entertainment System hardware clones
Products introduced in 1991
Products and services discontinued in 1997